Aegean is the seventh studio album by American post-punk band Savage Republic, released on March 23, 2014 by Mobilization Records.

Track listing

Personnel
Adapted from the Aegean liner notes.

Savage Republic
 Kerry Dowling – instruments
 Thom Fuhrmann – instruments, recording, design
 Ethan Port – instruments
 Alan Waddington – instruments
Additional musicians
 Adrian Carrillo – trombone (1, 11)
 Emad Gabra – cümbüş (6, 19)
 Greg Grunke – guitar (8)
 Hayden Ortiz – trumpet (1, 11)
 Stella Papandreopoulou – vocals (8)
 Blaine L. Reininger – violin (12, 19)

Production and additional personnel
 Jon Crawford – recording
 Bruce Licher – design
 Giorgos Nikas – painting
 Nick Paleologos – recording
 Akis Paschalidis – recording
 Savage Republic – production
 Don C. Tyler – mastering

Release history

References

2014 albums
Savage Republic albums